Bigelowina is a genus of crustaceans belonging to the family Nannosquillidae.

The species of this genus are found in the coasts of America, India, Australia.

Species:

Bigelowina biminiensis 
Bigelowina phalangium 
Bigelowina septemspinosa

References

Crustaceans